M20, M-20, or M.20 may refer to:

Transportation
 M20 (New York City bus), a New York City Bus route in Manhattan
 M-20 (Michigan highway), a state highway in Michigan
 M20 motorway, a road in Kent, United Kingdom
 M20 motorway (Ireland), a road, part of the N20 national primary road
 M20 Road (Zambia)
 M20 (Johannesburg), a Metropolitan Route in Johannesburg, South Africa
 M20 (Pretoria), a Metropolitan Route in Pretoria, South Africa
 M20 (Durban), a Metropolitan Route in Durban, South Africa
 M20 (Pietermaritzburg), a Metropolitan Route in Pietermaritzburg, South Africa
 M20 highway (Russia)
 Highway M20 (Ukraine)
 BMW M20, a 1976 automobile engine
 Macchi M.20, an Italian civil trainer aircraft
 Mooney M20, a general aviation aircraft 
 Northern Expressway, a motorway in Adelaide, South Australia

Science and technology
 Messier 20 (M20), a nebula also called the Trifid Nebula
 Olivetti M20, an Italian personal computer
 British NVC community M20, a mire biological community in the United Kingdom
 M-20 (computer), a Russian Soviet computer
 Garmin-Asus Nüvifone M20, a smartphone
 Samsung Galaxy M20, a smartphone

Firearms and military equipment
 M20 Armored Utility Car, a WWII-era American scout car
 M20, a Chinese copy of the Soviet TT-33 pistol
 M20 recoilless rifle, an American rifle
 M20 Super Bazooka, an American anti-tank rocket launcher
 M20 SLBM, a French nuclear missile
 M20 ballast tractor, the power source of the M19 tank recovery system
 M20 TBM, a Chinese tactical ballistic missile
 Miles M.20, a Second World War fighter
 M20 (rocket), a U.S. Army rocket of World War II

Ships
  - a Swedish minesweeper
  - a British M15 class monitor